The Story of Voyages, also translated as A Fairy Tale of Wanderings (Russian: Сказка странствий) is a 1983 Soviet Russian fantasy film directed by Alexander Mitta and starring Andrei Mironov. The film is notably darker and more adult-oriented than most of Soviet fantasy movies, which were usually made for children. It was a joint co-production of Russian, Czechoslovak, and Romanian studios.

Plot
In a medieval fantasy kingdom, two orphans, May and his sister Martha, live in poverty. A group of robbers kidnap May to use his magic talent: he feels sick when surrounded by gold, therefore he can feel gold from a long distance.

Martha goes on a quest to find her brother. She is soon joined by a travelling scientist, Orlando. Together, the two wander through various fantastic countries. They visit a city built on the back of a dragon, and see it burnt down when the dragon wakes. In another city, they are sentenced to death for starting a bar brawl. They manage to escape from prison using hang-glider Orlando invented. Finally they land in a country hit by Black Death, which is personified as a witch in black. Orlando sacrifices himself to stop the plague.

Years later, Martha finally finds May, who has changed dramatically. He became one of the robbers, a violent and evil person; he is rich, but feels sick of his affluence. Martha talks him out of this way of life. May magically destroys his castle and feels that the spirit of Orlando has been reborn in him.

Cast
 Andrei Mironov — Orlando, the travelling scientist
 Tatyana Aksyuta — Martha (voiced by Marina Neyolova)
 Lev Durov — Gorgon, the robber
 Baltybay Seytmamutov — Brutus, the robber
 Ksenia Piratinskaya — May as a child
 Valery Storozhik — May as an adult
 Karmen Galin — the Plague Witch (voiced by Yekaterina Vasilyeva)
 Veniamin Smekhov — Don Qixote
 Vladimir Basov — the lawyer
 Alexander Pyatkov — the driller
 Jean Lorin Florescu — the prosecutor (voiced by Viktor Sergachyov)

Reception
The Story of Voyages is in the List of 100 most important Science Fiction and Fantasy films by Mir Fantastiki magazine.

References

External links
  Skazka stranstviy (1983) at IMDb

Soviet fantasy films
Russian fantasy films
1980s Russian-language films
Films directed by Alexander Mitta
Films scored by Alfred Schnittke
Czechoslovak fantasy films
Romanian fantasy films
Czech fantasy films
Films about dragons
1983 fantasy films
Films set in the Middle Ages
Films about the Black Death